Bobai Balat,  better known by his stage name Bally B., is a Nigerian disc jockey, record producer, voiceover artist, and reality television personality. He garnered popularity as one of the housemates of the Big Brother Naija 2017 reality game show; a localised franchise of the Dutch game show. Among other jobs, he has worked as a school teacher in Lagos as well as a Statistician for the Federal Government. He is a baritone, known as Baritone Bally in the show. In 2015, Balat created an Afro infused electronic bootleg remix to Rihanna's hit song FourFiveSeconds, which brought industry recognition and led to a mash-up segment on Lagos city radio station; The Beat 99.9 FM.

Early life and career 
Growing up in a household with 3 music-loving elder siblings played a huge role in crafting his music passion and style. He spent most  of his adolescence years in Kaduna before moving to Nigeria's capital, Abuja at the age of 10 where he had his secondary education at Loyola Jesuit College.  He started his university education at University in 2006 studying there for two years before transferring to the American University of Nigeria for personal reasons. However, it was while still at Purdue University that Bally's love for music production and disc jockey began after befriending a fellow Nigerian rapper at his school. His rapper friend introduced him to the popular production software; FL Studio also known as Fruity Loops which Bally got really fond of and started trying his hand at music production. He then also decided to volunteer to disc jockey at different recreational spots in and around the Chicago area. This helped him hone his craft as a disc jockey as well as increase his confidence behind the turntables. After moving to the American University of Nigeria, Bally decided to take his passion for music even further becoming the popular go-to DJ not only within the University but also around town. He also was the only one with a music studio in his dorm in school therefore monopolising all music production and engineering done by students in campus at the same time raising capital to enable him buy more equipment.

Having grown up on his elder siblings diverse record collection, from soulful 80s/90s Hip Hop & RnB to the higher tempo rhythmic progressions of Makossa, all infused with his own personal affinity for the more electronic synth sounds coming out of Europe at the time, Bally ended up with quite a mixed spectrum of musical influence. Today this translates into sets where he picks apart and infuses together all the pieces of this music that he loves best, transitioning seamlessly between genres, Late contemporary Afrobeats to electronic dance music, hip-hop, trap.

Music career 
During his rise to fame, Balat got affiliated with a major record label in the Nigerian music industry; Aristokrat Records, the label responsible for bringing talented musician, Burna Boy to the limelight. Together, Balat and the label were able to produce some of the best Afro infused remixes and mash-ups to popular international hits around. He has officially released one single called "Ali" in (2015) featuring then label mate MoJeed and popular Abuja based rapper Sute. Bally is the genesis of a new breed of DJs coming out of Africa. A remarkable mixologist, he delves heavily in the production and engineering of mash-ups, remixes and original tracks mostly in the EDM genre.

DJ/Production Career 
Bally began his musical journey while still in high school, creating playlists and arranging music for all major social events and parties. He however, bought his first set of turntables and began active disc jockey while at Purdue University. Along with his housemates, he became widely popular for organising parties all around campus as disc jockey for an eclectic mix of students with varying musical tastes. Since then he has held a number of club residencies around the world. A founding DJ of the Grotto Fashion Club in Abuja, Nigeria he progressed to a resident stint at the Gatecrasher club in Nottingham, while still touring the better part of the UK playing various gigs. He has also been called upon to play alongside some of the biggest names in Afrobeats music today.

Over the last couple of years he has been honing his craft as a record producer, putting out a long array of music projects along the way. His goal has been to spearhead the EDM movement in Africa while at the same time doing his part in spreading the gospel of Afrobeats music to the rest of the world. Therefore, his mash-ups and remixes infuse both contemporary African rhythms and vocals with the piercing synth sounds of electronic dance music giving birth to a completely new refreshing high. His productions however, though geared towards certain genres still remain highly experimental, reminiscent of early Diplo. His mash-up series "Mash-Up Mondays" where he releases a brand new mash-up every Monday is currently hosted on The Beat 99.9 FM radio station during the Morning Rush show.

Acting 
Bally delved into music and film almost at the same time while in secondary school and took part in various plays and dramas around campus. After completing his tertiary education he came back to Nigeria and enrolled at the Royal Arts Academy, Surulere, to attain formal training in Acting for both stage and film.  With a series of short films under his belt including The Art of Deceit by Cynthia Toyo (2008), Baby Mama by Kudus and a few TV appearances guest-hosting The Late Show on COOL TV.

Big Brother Naija 
In 2017, he went in as one of an eventual 14 housemates on the second season of the popular reality game show Big Brother Naija 2017 (formerly known as Big Brother Nigeria) finishing as the 5th runner-up. The show's high ratings and overwhelming popularity sprung Bally along with his other contesting housemates into instant stardom, becoming social media & real media heavyweights. The show also enabled him discover a fresh talent he never knew he had; his Husky Baritone Voice. His voice along with his trademark eyes and good looks got female audiences salivating. After a good run of surviving 9 weeks without ever being up for nomination he was eventually evicted in week 10 just one week shy of the grand finale.

Bally Rally Movement 
The Bally Rally Movement began in 2017 while Bally was still in the Big Brother House. It was the name coined by his fans to signify their support and movement behind him. However, after he was eventually evicted from the house he came out to join the campaign revamping it into a social cause to promote peace and youth empowerment through music.  The Bally Rally movement has since then been partitioned into two initiatives; "Bally Rally Out reach" and "Bally Rally Party". These two initiatives play out at various cities around the nation within 2 days. The Bally Rally Outreach comprises charity themed excursions to areas and institutions of lower social privilege such as Orphanage homes and IDP camps to provide aid and support as a way of giving back to society. The Bally Rally Party on the other hand occurs on the next day, which encompasses a mini carnival, & music concert featuring numerous games, food, drinks, merchandise sales and musical performances from artists and DJs alike.

Discography

Mixes 
 Dinner & Dessert (2015)
 Bally's Classic Hit-List Vol. 1 (2015)
 Ballystic Radio (The Prequel 1 & 2) (2014–2011)
 Ultimate Party Mix (2011)
 TGIF Naija Edition  (2011)
 Sex Music Vol. 1 & 2 (2011/2012)

Official Remixes 
 Bigger Better Best (Bally Twerk Remix) Pucado (2014)
 For Me (Bally Dance Remix) Tolumide (2012)

Bootleg (Unofficial) Remixes 
 Earned It (Afrotronic Remix) The Weekend (2015)
 FourFiveSeconds (Afrotronic Remix) Rihanna (2015)
 Call Me Maybe (Afrobeat Remix) Carly Rae Jepsen (2012)

MashUps 
MashUp Mondays on the Beat 99.9fm (2014–present)
 My Moment (Bally Trippy MashUp)
 Pray To God (Bally Hideaway MashUp)
 Hell of a Night (Bally Spin MashUp)
 Shake Body (Bally U & Me MashUp) 				
 Skibo (Bally Shake MashUp)
 Johnny (Bally Sexy Waist MashUp)
 The Kick (Bally Epic MashUp)
 Personally (Bally Payback MashUp)
 Youngi Olowo (Bally Bounce MashUp)
 Why You Love Me (Bally Blow MashUp)

Original Tracks 
 Ali ft. MoJeed & Sute (2015)

See also 
List of Nigerian DJs

References 

British DJs
Living people
Nigerian DJs
Year of birth missing (living people)
Place of birth missing (living people)
Nigerian record producers
Nigerian television personalities
People from Kaduna State